Lost in the Music is the second studio album by five piece band, The Gypsy Queens. It was released in the United Kingdom on 23 June 2014. The album entered the Amazon charts at number 1 of new releases.

Background
Following signing their record deal with London Records (Universal Music) and the success of their debut album with the legendary producer Larry Klein (who has worked with Joni Mitchell, Herbie Hancock and Madeleine Peyroux) in Los Angeles in April 2012, The Gypsy Queens went on to record their second album, Lost in the Music, at RAK Studios in London. The album features songs such as "Losing Myself in the Music", written by Phil Thornalley, "Do You St. Tropez", "Parole Parole", featuring Hayley Westenra and "Almost Like Being in Love" featuring Ben Taylor. It was produced by Didier Casnati, the lead singer of the band.

Track listing

Release history

References

2014 albums
The Gypsy Queens albums